Ayre & Michael is a House of Keys constituency in the north of the Isle of Man. It was created for the 2016 general election and elects 2 MHKs.

It is easily the largest Keys constituency in area, and includes the parishes of Michael, Ballaugh, Jurby, Andreas, Bride and Lezayre.

Elections
{| class="wikitable" style="margin-right:1em; font-size:95%;"
|+ style="background-color:#f2f2f2; margin-bottom:-1px; border:1px solid #aaa; padding:0.2em 0.4em;" | General election 2021: Ayre & Michael
! scope="col" rowspan="2" colspan="2" style="width:15em;" | Party
! scope="col" rowspan="2" style="width:17em;" | Candidate
! scope="col" colspan="2"                     | Votes
|-
! scope="col"             style="width:4em;"  | Count
! scope="col"             style="width:6em;"  | Of total (%)

There were serious allegations, which were discussed by a Select Committee of Tynwald in 2016–17, about the conduct of this election. See also the Report of the Acting Attorney General.

References

Constituencies of the Isle of Man
Constituencies established in 2016
2016 establishments in the Isle of Man